In Euclidean geometry, a circumconic is a conic section that passes through the three vertices of a triangle, and an inconic is a conic section inscribed in the sides, possibly extended, of a triangle.

In trilinear coordinates, the general circumconic is the locus of a variable point  satisfying an equation

for some point .

Centers and tangent lines

Circumconic

The center of the general circumconic is the point

The lines tangent to the general circumconic at the vertices  are, respectively,

Inconic

The center of the general inconic is the point

Other features

Circumconic

 

 

 The general circumconic reduces to a parabola if and only if

 

and to a rectangular hyperbola if and only if

 

 Of all triangles inscribed in a given ellipse, the centroid of the one with greatest area coincides with the center of the ellipse. The given ellipse, going through this triangle's three vertices and centered at the triangle's centroid, is called the triangle's Steiner circumellipse.

Inconic

 The general inconic reduces to a parabola if and only if

 

in which case it is tangent externally to one of the sides of the triangle and is tangent to the extensions of the other two sides.

Define

 

  

where

 A point in the interior of a triangle is the center of an inellipse of the triangle if and only if  the point lies in the interior of the triangle whose vertices lie at the midpoints of the original triangle's sides. For a given point inside that medial triangle, the inellipse with its center at that point is unique.
 The inellipse with the largest area is the Steiner inellipse, also called the midpoint inellipse, with its center at the triangle's centroid. In general, the ratio of the inellipse's area to the triangle's area, in terms of the unit-sum barycentric coordinates  of the inellipse's center, is

which is maximized by the centroid's barycentric coordinates .

 The lines connecting the tangency points of any inellipse of a triangle with the opposite vertices of the triangle are concurrent.

Extension to quadrilaterals

All the centers of inellipses of a given quadrilateral fall on the line segment connecting the midpoints of the diagonals of the quadrilateral.

Examples

 Circumconics
 Circumcircle, the unique circle that passes through a triangle's three vertices
 Steiner circumellipse, the unique ellipse that passes through a triangle's three vertices and is centered at the triangle's centroid
 Kiepert hyperbola, the unique conic which passes through a triangle's three vertices, its centroid, and its orthocenter
 Jeřábek hyperbola, a rectangular hyperbola centered on a triangle's nine-point circle and passing through the triangle's three vertices as well as its circumcenter, orthocenter, and various other notable centers
 Feuerbach hyperbola, a rectangular hyperbola that passes through a triangle's orthocenter, Nagel point, and various other notable points, and has center on the nine-point circle.
 Inconics
 Incircle, the unique circle that is internally tangent to a triangle's three sides
 Steiner inellipse, the unique ellipse that is tangent to a triangle's three sides at their midpoints
 Mandart inellipse, the unique ellipse tangent to a triangle's sides at the contact points of its excircles
 Kiepert parabola
 Yff parabola

References

External links
 Circumconic at MathWorld
 Inconic at MathWorld

Conic sections